Vasili Vasilyevich Sumnakaev (born 17 November 1995) is a Russian professional footballer.

External links 
 
 
 Player's profile at pressball.by
 Player's profile at Znicz Biała Piska website

1995 births
Living people
Russian footballers
Russian expatriate footballers
Expatriate footballers in Belarus
Expatriate footballers in Poland
FC Dynamo Brest players
Association football defenders
Belarusian Premier League players